Mewat is a historical region of Haryana and Rajasthan states in northwestern India. The loose boundaries of Mewat generally include Hathin tehsil of Palwal District and Nuh district of Haryana, Alwar (Tijara, Kishangarh, Bas, Ramgarh, Laxmangarh, Kathumar tehsils and Aravalli hills tract), Mahwa, Rajasthan and Mandawar, Rajasthan in Dausa district and Bharatpur districts (Pahari, Nagar, Deeg, Nadbai, Bhusawar, Weir and Kaman tehsils) of Rajasthan, and Chhata Tehsil of Mathura district in Uttar Pradesh. The main centre areas of Mewat are Firozpur Jhirka, Nuh, Ramgarh, Paharisikri and Punahana. Mewat region lies in between Delhi-Jaipur-Agra. In simple words Mewat region consists of Nuh district, eastern part of Alwar district and western part of Bharatpur district. Mandawar, Rajasthan and Mahwa, Rajasthan is in Dausa district but there are many Meos villages near Mahwa, Mandawar, Garhi sawairam, Pinan. The region roughly corresponds to the ancient kingdom of Matsya, founded in the 5th century BCE. Mewati dialect, a slight variant of the Haryanvi and Rajasthani dialects of Hindi, is spoken in rural areas of the region. Mewati Gharana is a distinctive style of Indian classical music.

History

Wali-e-Mewat (Khanzada) & Mewat Naresh (Matsya)

The title of Wali-e-Mewat was used by the Khanzada Mewati rulers (Descendants of Lord Sri Krishna) of Mewat State from 1372 till 1527, who ruled Mewat as an independent state. In 1372, Sultan Firuz Shah Tughlaq granted Raja Nahar Khan Mewati of Kotla Fort, the Lordship of Mewat. He established a hereditary polity in Mewat and proclaimed the title of Wali-e-Mewat. Later his descendants affirmed their own sovereignty in Mewat and ruled there till 1527. Current titular from Matsya Kindom of Mewat principality is Raja Matsyaveera Fuzail Waris Raiji Pukhrajji Topji Dhartipati Vaidik Aryan Brahmin (311th Descendant of Lord Sri Ravana) and from Khanzada Dynasty is Khanzadi bibi Marwa Meo Raja Yaduvira (150th Descendant Lord Sri Krishna)

British Era
During the British raj, they became under the Alwar state and Bharatpur state. After the Indian Rebellion of 1857 the area passed to the direct control of British rule.

Furthermore, during the colonial era, religious syncretism was seen throughout the region.

During 1947, thousands of Meo were displaced from Alwar district and Bharatpur district. Many Thousands were killed. They shifted to Gurgaon and many went to Pakistan.
Bacchu Singh, the prince of Bharatpur, played a main role in this violence. Earlier Kathumar, Nadbai, Kumher, Kherli, Bhusawar, Weir and till Mahwa was heavily populated with Meo Muslim Rajputs population.The population of Meos drastically decreased in Alwar and Bharatpur. Many old mosques are still present there. 
Gandhiji also visited the village of Ghasera in the Nuh district and requested Meos not to leave India. Because of Gandhiji some Meos were resettled in Laxmangarh, Nagar, Kaman, Deeg of Alwar district and Bharatpur district. The people of Ghasera still celebrate Mewat day.

Economic and infrastructure developments

The main occupation in district is agriculture along with allied and agro-based activities. The Meo Rajputs are the predominant population group and are all agriculturists. Agriculture is mostly rain fed except in small pockets where canal irrigation is available. Agriculture production measured in terms of crop yield per hectare is low in comparison to the other districts of the State. Animal husbandry, particularly dairy, is the secondary source of income for the people and those who live closer to the hilly ranges of Aravali also keep sheep and goats. Milk yields are not so low, however, due to heavy indebtedness most of the farmers are forced to sell the milk to the lenders at lower than normal price, which drastically reduces their income from the milk. Towns like Punhana, Pinangwan, Ferozepur Jhirka, Taoru and Nuh are major hub of retail shops and acts as backbone of day-to-day life in area. The district also has a MMTC-PAMP factory located in the Rojka-Meo industrial estate.

The Delhi Mumbai Expressway is an under construction expressway which will pass through Mewat. Gurugram-Sohna-Nuh-Alwar road has been upgraded to National Highway and is known as NH 248A. Western Peripheral Expressway passing through Mewat also provides high speed connectivity to NH-8. The planned Rewari-Bhiwadi-Palwal railway line and Delhi-Sohna-Nuh-Ferozepur Jhirka-Alwar railway will pass through Mewat near district headquarter, Nuh.

Shaheed Hasan Khan Mewati Government Medical College at Nalhar is now operational near Nuh. Haryana Wakf Board has set up its first engineering college in Mewat which is operational near Nuh.

Mewat is one of the most underdeveloped area of the nation, Up to 60% of men here find employment as truck drivers and only few schools go beyond 8th class schooling.

Demographics 
The population of Mewat District.

Media
Mewat has two community radio stations: Radio Mewat and Alfaz-e-Mewat. Radio Mewat, launched in 2010, endeavours to give voice to the voiceless in backward communities. Alfaz-e-Mewat, launched in 2012, provides rural communities in and around the Mewat district with information and participatory dialogue about agriculture, water and soil health, and governance issues.

Mewat has its own monthly magazine named Mewat Kal AAj Kal. This magazine runs by Mewati students who are studying in different esteemed and prestigious educational institutions across the country. Presently Mohd Juber Khan is the editor & publisher of this RNI registered magazine.

See also
 Mewati cattle
 Hasan Khan Mewati
 Mahendra Mewati
 Maniram
 Ahirwal
 Bagar tract
 Deshwali
 Doab
 Khadir and Bangar
 Khanzada Rajputs
 Grand Trunk Road
 Nardak
 kamran singariya

References

 
  https://nuh.gov.in/demography/

External links

Mewat Development Agency
http://www.rkktrust.org/
Against History, Against State: Counterperspectives from the Margins by Shail Mayaram
http://www.radiomewat.org/
Sehgal Foundation

Mewat people's also called as "Mewati"

 
Regions of Rajasthan
Haryana
Regions of India
Historical Indian regions